Bahama Buck's is a privately held franchise in the USA specializing in shaved ice and other frozen non-alcoholic beverages. The company is headquartered in Lubbock, Texas.

History
In the summer of 1990, Blake Buchanan opened the first Bahama Buck's in Lubbock. He started with one ice shaver with the intention of opening a stand to work through the summer. Constructing the original store by hand, he enlisted volunteer help from three generations of his family. The first stand was staffed by Texas Tech University students.

Buchanan's wife, Kippi, was announced as the COO in 2022. Eric Lee is currently the CFO.

In 1993, two more shops were opened in Tempe, Arizona. By mid-1993, Bahama Buck's Franchise Corporation was formed and began selling franchise licenses to franchisees.

Bahama Buck's was listed in the Guinness Book of World Records in 2010 for creating the world's largest shaved ice. "The Sno" weighed 25,080 lbs. and measured 15 feet 6 inches tall.

By 2022, Bahama Buck's operated over 100 stores in many states including: California, Arizona, Nevada, Utah, New Mexico, Texas, Florida, Missouri, Colorado, Oklahoma, and Puerto Rico, with over 100 additional stores planned.

Operations
In addition to shaved ice, Bahama Buck's also sells smoothies, frozen coffee, and specialty sodas called "Bahama Sodas" as well as various Bahama Buck's-themed clothing items. Bahama Buck's sells over 100 original shaved ice flavors including a tribute to Blake Buchanan's alma mater, Texas Tech University, called "Red Raider".

References

External links
 Bahama Buck's official website

Restaurants in Texas
Companies based in Lubbock, Texas
Restaurants established in 1990